Onib Olmedo (July 7, 1937 – September 8, 1996) was a Filipino painter acclaimed by critics as one of the major Filipino artists of the 20th century. Olmedo created a body of works that utilizes the expressionist technique of distortion to portray the inner torment experienced by modern man.

His paintings are characterized by an implosive impact but have an uplifting and ennobling quality, celebrating the triumph of the human spirit in the face of pain and anguish. At the same time, they are social commentaries with touches of wit and irony – reflections of the artist's quintessential, down-to-earth humor. The subjects of his paintings were the denizens of Sampaloc and Ermita, including musicians, prostitutes, vendors and waiters, as well as people from the upper strata like society matrons, corporate executives and ballerinas.

Olmedo died in 1996 when he was only 59 years old. His impact in the art scene continues to be felt on this day, as evidenced by a whole new generation of artists who are self-confessed Olmedo disciples, producing works inspired by their icon's distinctive style, and putting up exhibitions that have paid homage to their late master.

Career
1959–1961   Architect, Pablo Antonio & Associates

1961–1963   Architect, Pacific Merchandising Co.

1963–1968   Architect, Private practice

1959–1996   Weekend Job - Racing Judge and Steward, Manila Jockey Club

1969–1996   Full-time Artist

Awards

Exhibitions
 1970 Group Show, Solidaridad Galleries, Manila
 1971 "Singkong Suka", Solidaridad Galleries, Manila
 1975 Gallery Bleue, Manila
 1976 "Beinteng Suka", Galleria Duemila, Manila
 1978 Heritage Art Center, Manila
 1979 Competition of Painters, Cagnes Sur-Mer, France
 1982 Competition of Painters, France-Netherlands-Germany
 1982 Philam Life Art Hall, Manila
 1982 Little Gallery, Manila
 1983 Cayman Galleries, New York, USA
 1984 Two-Man Show, Gallery Frames
 1988 Crane Collection Galleries, Florida, USA
 1988 International Art Competition, Baghdad, Iraq
 1989 Philippine Center, Fifth Avenue, New York, USA
 1990 "Three Filipino Figurative Expressionist - Kiukik, Olmedo and Saprid", CCP, Manila
 1991 Hotel Intercontinental Manila
 1992 Competition of Painters, Cagnes Sur-Mer, France
 1993 CAPP Art Gallery, Cebu City
 1993 Finale Gallery Manila
 1993 Pacific Star Hotel, Guam, USA
 1994 Hiraya Gallery, Manila
 1995 Philippine Embassy, Frankfurt, Germany
 1996 Philippine Embassy, Vienna, Austria

Retrospective shows
2007
 "Dimensions of Depth", Cultural Center of the Philippines

2010
 "In My Life Soul Portraits by Onib Olmedo", Ayala Museum

Posthumous shows
1998
 Ermita: Soul Portraits by Onib Olmedo, Galleria Duemila

2002
 Quintessential Onib, Galleria Duemila

2003
 Homage to Onib Olmedo, Gallery Joaquin
 A Tribute to Onib Olmedo, Ateneo Professional School

2007
 My Friend, Onib Olmedo, Galleria Duemila, Metropolitan Museum, Manila
 The Women of Onib, Gallery Nine, Art Walk Megamall, Mandaluyong

2012
 Celebrating 75 Years of Onib, Charlie's Art Gallery, Bacolod

2014
 Onib Olmedo, a Commemorative Exhibit, Galeria Lienzo, Serendra, Bonifacio Global City, Taguig

2016
 Onib in 3D, Secret Fresh Gallery, Makati

2017
 Red Vienna, Manila House, Bonifacio Global City, Taguig

2020
 Onib Olmedo: The Triumph of Everyman, Art Fair Philippines’ Special Exhibition, Makati

Organization affiliations
Saturday Group of Artists (1969 - 1996)
1994 - President, Saturday Group

References

1937 births
1996 deaths
People from Manila
Artists from Metro Manila
20th-century Filipino painters
Mapúa University alumni